The year 1995 is the first year in the history of Fighting Network Rings, a mixed martial arts promotion based in Japan. In 1995 Fighting Network Rings held three events beginning with, Rings: Budokan Hall 1995.

Events list

Rings: Budokan Hall 1995

Rings: Budokan Hall 1995 was an event held on January 25, 1995, at Budokan Hall in Tokyo, Japan.

Results

Rings Holland: Free Fight

Rings Holland: Free Fight was an event held on February 19, 1995, at Sporthallen Zuid in Amsterdam, North Holland, Netherlands.

Results

Rings: Battle Dimensions Tournament 1995 Opening Round

Rings: Battle Dimensions Tournament 1995 Opening Round was an event held on October 21, 1995.

Results

See also 
 Fighting Network Rings
 List of Fighting Network Rings events

References

Fighting Network Rings events
1995 in mixed martial arts